Yerdos Zhanabergenov is an amateur boxer from Kazakhstan, best known for winning the light heavyweight title at the 2005 World Amateur Boxing Championships.

Career
In 2005, he won a gold medal at the Asian Amateur Boxing Championships, and then went on to the 2005 World Amateur Boxing Championships, where he defeated Mourad Sahraoui, Uzbek Olympic bronze medalist Utkirbek Haydarov in the semifinal and Marijo Šivolija in the final.

He didn't compete in major international events after 2006.

References

Living people
Boxers at the 2006 Asian Games
Kazakhstani male boxers
AIBA World Boxing Championships medalists
Year of birth missing (living people)
Asian Games competitors for Kazakhstan
Light-heavyweight boxers
21st-century Kazakhstani people